Patrick Lundqvist (born 3 June 1991) is a Swedish male badminton player.

Achievements

BWF International Challenge/Series
Men's Doubles

 BWF International Challenge tournament
 BWF International Series tournament
 BWF Future Series tournament

References

External links
 

1991 births
Living people
Swedish male badminton players